The Cambodian rebellion of 1820, also known as Neak sel Rebellion (lit. "the holy man's rebellion"), was a Cambodian anti-Vietnamese rebellion led by a monk named Kai.

In 1819, Khmer labors were forced to reconstruct the Vietnamese Vĩnh Tế Canal. The Khmer labors were heavily exploited by being forced to do hard work, which resulted thousands of deaths from fatigue and consequent disease during the canal's construction. Kai, a monk originally from Wat Sambaur who claimed supernatural powers, revolted against the Vietnamese.

Kai occupied the Khmer holy site Ba Phnom and subsequently declared king. Most of his followers were recruited in the area around Tây Ninh.Many Buddhist monks joined his forces and killed Vietnamese. The rebels marched toward Phnom Penh, three Cambodian generals, Chaophraya Tei (or Somdet Tei, Samdech Tei), Narin Kol and Naike, joined them. King Ang Chan wanted to flee the capital, he sent a letter to Saigon to ask for help. Lê Văn Duyệt, the viceroy of Cochinchina, ordered Nguyễn Văn Thoại and Nguyễn Văn Trí to assemble an expeditionary force. The Vietnamese army defeated the rebels, killed many of them. Kai escaped,  but was pursued and killed with many monks in Kampong Cham.Kai's assistance, the novice Kuy, escaped to live among the Lao. 

Other leaders had to surrender, including Chaophraya Tei, Narin Kol and Naike. They were put to death in Phnom Penh and Saigon.

Notes
Footnote

Citations

References

See also 
 Cambodian rebellion (1811–12)
 Cambodian rebellion (1840)
 Anti-Vietnamese sentiment

 

19th century in Cambodia
19th century in Vietnam
Cambodia–Vietnam relations
Rebellions in the Nguyễn dynasty
Wars involving Vietnam
Wars involving Cambodia
Rebellions in Asia
Conflicts in 1820
19th-century rebellions
National liberation movements
Anti-Vietnamese sentiment
1820 in Asia